Arne Rolighed (Flade på Mors, 2 June 1947) is a Danish former politician and the current president of the Danish Cancer Society until July 2010. Although he was never a member of the Danish parliament, Prime minister Poul Nyrup Rasmussen appointed him as Health Minister in December 2000, a position he held until the Social Democratic government lost the 2001 parliamentary election to Venstre's Anders Fogh Rasmussen.

Early life 
Born in Flade på Mors. She graduated in Political Science from Aarhus University.

Notes

1947 births
Living people
Danish Health Ministers
21st-century Danish politicians
People from Morsø Municipality